The Ikarus Grasshopper is a German high-wing, single-place, hang glider, designed by Thomas Pellicci and produced by his company Ikarus Drachen Thomas Pellicci.

Design and development
The Grasshopper is intended to be a simple single surface glider with easy handling and modest performance for flight training and school use. It employs a very large wing area, low aspect ratio and low weight to make it easy for students to take-off and land. Unlike many hang glider models, the Grasshopper is available in just one size.

The aircraft is made from aluminum tubing, with the wing covered in Dacron sailcloth. Its  span wing is cable braced from a single kingpost. It is certified as DHV Class 1.

Specifications (Grasshopper)

References

External links

Hang gliders